Alan Connolly (born 19 July 2001) is an Irish hurler who plays as a full-forward for club side Blackrock and at inter-county level with the Cork senior hurling team.

Playing career

Blackrock

Having earlier lined out in the juvenile, minor and under-21 grades, Connolly joined the Blackrock senior team in advance of the 2019 Championship. He made his championship debut on 10 August 2019 when he lined out at right corner-forward in a 1–25 to 2–16 defeat by Newtownshandrum.

On 4 October 2020, Connolly was selected at full-forward when Blackrock faced Glen Rovers in the Cork PSHC final. He top scored for the team with 0-13, including ten points from frees, and claimed a winners' medal after being named man of the match in the 4–26 to 4-18 extra-time win. Connolly also ended the championship as the top scorer with 5-52.

Cork

Minor and under-20

Connolly first lined out for Cork as a member of the minor team during the 2018 Munster Championship. He made his first appearance for the team on 20 May 2018 when he came on as a 24th-minute substitute for Kevin Moynihan in a 0–26 to 3-13 first-round defeat of Clare.

Connolly was added to the Cork under-20 team prior to the start of the 2020 Munster Championship. He made his debut in that grade on 19 October 2020 in a 2–24 to 2–10 defeat of Kerry.

Senior

After a successful club campaign with Blackrock, Connolly was drafted onto the Cork senior hurling team prior to the start of the 2020 Munster Championship but remained unused throughout the campaign. He was retained on the Cork panel for the 2021 National League. Connolly made his first senior appearance on 9 May 2021 when he scored two goals after coming on as a substitute for Shane Barrett in a 5-22 to 1-27 league defeat of Waterford.

Personal life

Connolly's uncles, Tom and Jim Cashman, won several All-Ireland medals with Cork between 1977 and 1990. His grandfather, Mick Cashman, was a substitute on Cork's 1952-1954 three-in-a-row team, while his granduncle, Jimmy Brohan, also lined out with that team.

Career statistics

Club

Inter-county

Honours

Blackrock
Cork Premier Senior Hurling Championship: 2020

Cork
 All-Ireland Under-20 Hurling Championship: 2020
 Munster Under-20 Hurling Championship: 2020

References

2001 births
Living people
Blackrock National Hurling Club hurlers
Cork inter-county hurlers
Hurling forwards